Nicholas Allen Popaditch (born July 2, 1967) is a medically retired United States Marine Corps gunnery sergeant who gained fame as the "Cigar Marine", recipient of the Silver Star and Purple Heart. He ran unsuccessfully as the 2010 Republican candidate for California's 51st congressional district, losing to incumbent Democrat Bob Filner. He ran again in 2012 in the 53rd congressional district, losing to incumbent Democrat Susan Davis.

Early life and education
Popaditch was born in East Chicago, Indiana and was raised in Terre Haute, Indiana. After choosing not to take up a college scholarship, he enlisted in the Marine Corps.

Military career
Popaditch enlisted in the US Marine Corps in 1986, served as a tank commander, and eventually rose to the rank of gunnery sergeant. He saw action in the first Gulf War in 1991 and was honorably discharged in 1992. In 1995, he rejoined the Corps and served with the 1st Tank Battalion at Marine Corps Air Ground Combat Center Twentynine Palms and later became a drill instructor at Marine Corps Recruit Depot San Diego.

During the Iraq War, Staff Sergeant Popaditch was assigned as a tank commander and platoon sergeant. Participating in the 2003 invasion of Iraq, his unit gained fame when it helped topple the statue of Saddam Hussein in Firdos Square on April 9, 2003. Associated Press photographer Laurent Rebours photographed Popaditch in his tank's cupola, smoking a cigar with the statue of Saddam looming in the background. The image, which earned him the nickname "The Cigar Marine," appeared on the front pages of newspapers around the world to describe the Battle of Baghdad. He would later reveal that his smoking was a celebration of his and his wife's twelfth wedding anniversary as well as victory. Following his return to the United States, he was promoted to gunnery sergeant and volunteered to return to Iraq in 2004.

During his second deployment, Popaditch commanded tanks again in the First Battle of Fallujah in April 2004. During the battle on April 7, supported dismounted infantry with a pair of M1A1 Abrams, and turning onto a narrow street, he opened his hatch for better visibility despite the constant RPG-7 attacks. He was wounded in action in an ambush when a rocket propelled grenade struck him in the head. Blinded and deafened, he struggled to maintain consciousness until his tank was moved out of danger, then was evacuated to Landstuhl Regional Medical Center in Germany. After a prolonged stay, he was sent back to the United States, ultimately losing his right eye (due to damage to the optic nerve) and hearing in his right ear. At Naval Medical Center San Diego, some of the vision in his remaining left eye was restored by the hospital's medical professionals, while his ocular prosthesis features the Eagle, Globe, and Anchor instead of a pupil. On November 10, 2005, he was awarded the Silver Star for actions in combat. and medically retired at the rank of Gunnery Sergeant on April 22.

Civilian career
After a brief recovery period living in Monterey, California, Popaditch became an active advocate of veteran's issues. In addition to advising and consulting, he serves on the boards of multiple organizations advancing the care of wounded veterans and their families, such as the Purple Heart Advisory board of the Freedom is Not Free organization, the Vet Foundation, the US Department of Veterans Affair's Patient-Centered Care Steering Committee, and speaks for the Injured Marine Semper Fi Fund, The Marine Corps Scholarship Foundation of the Desert Cities, and the Independence Fund. Popaditch was profiled by MTV when he was trained by the Wounded Marine Career Foundation in sound production, and later graduated magna cum laude earning a Bachelor of Arts in education from San Diego State University.

In 2008, Popaditch authored, with Mike Steere, the memoir Once a Marine: An Iraq War Tank Commander's Inspirational Memoir of Combat, Courage, and Recovery, (Savas Beatie LLC, 2008), which detailed his combat experiences, recovery, and difficulties with disability and Veterans Administration. It received favorable reviews, was featured on the Commandant of the Marine Corps' recommended professional reading list for all ranks, won The Military-Writers Book of the Year for 2009, and was a national book club selection. In 2012, Popaditch was residing in Chula Vista, and was married, and has two sons. In 2013, Popaditch authored a 178-page book The Ultimate Marine Recruit Training Guidebook, a book for potential Marine recruits. In 2014, Popaditch was studying to become a math teacher.

Political campaigns

2010

On November 10, 2009, Popaditch announced his campaign for California's 51st congressional district as a Republican. The incumbent, Democrat Bob Filner, has held the seat since 1992. It is viewed by most as a Democratic district, though George W. Bush earned 46% of the vote there in 2004. Popaditch was endorsed by former presidential candidate and Governor of Arkansas Mike Huckabee and former Congressman Duncan L. Hunter; he cited his "love of country" for why he was running for political office. There was also a controversy within the Veterans of Foreign Wars when members disagreed over endorsement, another when the Imperial Valley Press published an editorial cartoon mocking his eyepatch (which Filner called "in poor taste"), and a third when Filner's campaign ran an advertisement accusing Popoditch of not voting in the past eleven years. He was unopposed in the Republican primary, was profiled in the Wall Street Journal, but lost 60%-40% to Filner.

2012

In January 2012, Popaditch announced his intention to seek the congressional seat in the newly redistricted 53rd Congressional District against incumbent Democrat Susan Davis. He received 42% of the vote during the June primary. Endorsed by the San Diego Union Tribune, he lost to Davis in the general election, receiving 39.6% of the vote.

Awards
Popaditch is the recipient of the following awards:

Silver Star citation

References

External links

Once a Marine: An Iraq War Tank Commander’s Inspirational Memoir of Combat, Courage, and Recovery
Popaditch for Congress 2010

1967 births
Living people
United States Marines
California Republicans
People from Chula Vista, California
United States Marine Corps personnel of the Gulf War
United States Marine Corps personnel of the Iraq War
People from East Chicago, Indiana
San Diego State University alumni
Tank personnel
Recipients of the Silver Star
Candidates in the 2010 United States elections
Candidates in the 2012 United States elections